Meistera is an Asian genus of plants in the family Zingiberaceae.  Species have been recorded from Tropical & Subtropical Asia to northern Queensland.

Species
Plants of the World Online currently includes:

 Meistera aculeata (Roxb.) Skornick. & M.F.Newman
 Meistera acuminata (Thwaites) Skornick. & M.F.Newman
 Meistera agastyamalayana (V.P.Thomas & M.Sabu) Skornick. & M.F.Newman
 Meistera benthamiana (Trim.) Skornick. & M.F.Newman
 Meistera botryoidea (Cowley) Skornick. & M.F.Newman
 Meistera calcarata (Lamxay & M.F.Newman) Skornick. & M.F.Newman
 Meistera cannicarpa (Wight) Skornick. & M.F.Newman
 Meistera celsa (Lamxay & M.F.Newman) Skornick. & M.F.Newman
 Meistera cerasina (Ridl.) Skornick. & M.F.Newman
 Meistera chinensis (Chun ex T.L.Wu) Skornick. & M.F.Newman
 Meistera dallachyi (F.Muell.) Skornick. & M.F.Newman
 Meistera deoriana (D.P.Dam & N.Dam) Skornick. & M.F.Newman
 Meistera echinocarpa (Alston) Skornick. & M.F.Newman
 Meistera elephantorum (Pierre ex Gagnep.) Skornick. & M.F.Newman
 Meistera fulviceps (Thwaites) Skornick. & M.F.Newman
 Meistera gagnepainii (T.L.Wu, K.Larsen & Turland) Skornick. & M.F.Newman
 Meistera ghatica (K.G.Bhat) Skornick. & M.F.Newman
 Meistera graminifolia (Thwaites) Skornick. & M.F.Newman
 Meistera gyrolophos (R.M.Sm.) Skornick. & M.F.Newman
 Meistera kinabaluensis (R.M.Sm.) Skornick. & M.F.Newman
 Meistera koenigii (J.F.Gmel.) Skornick. & M.F.Newman
 Meistera lappacea (Ridl.) Skornick. & M.F.Newman
 Meistera loheri (K.Schum.) Skornick. & M.F.Newman
 Meistera masticatorium (Thwaites) Skornick. & M.F.Newman
 Meistera mentawaiensis (A.J.Droop) Skornick. & M.F.Newman
 Meistera mizoramensis (M.Sabu, V.P.Thomas & Vanchh.) Skornick. & M.F.Newman
 Meistera muricarpa (Elmer) Skornick. & M.F.Newman
 Meistera newmanii (M.Sabu & V.P.Thomas) Skornick. & M.F.Newman
 Meistera nilgirica (V.P.Thomas & M.Sabu) Skornick. & M.F.Newman
 Meistera ochrea (Ridl.) Skornick. & M.F.Newman
 Meistera oligantha (K.Schum.) Skornick. & M.F.Newman
 Meistera propinqua (Ridl.) Skornick. & M.F.Newman
 Meistera sahyadrica (V.P.Thomas & M.Sabu) Skornick. & M.F.Newman
 Meistera sceletescens (R.M.Sm.) Skornick. & M.F.Newman
 Meistera stephanocolea (Lamxay & M.F.Newman) Skornick. & M.F.Newman
 Meistera tomrey (Gagnep.) Skornick. & M.F.Newman
 Meistera trichostachya (Alston) Skornick. & M.F.Newman
 Meistera vermana (S.Tripathi & V.Prakash) Skornick. & M.F.Newman
 Meistera verrucosa (S.Q.Tong) Skornick. & M.F.Newman
 Meistera vespertilio (Gagnep.) Skornick. & M.F.Newman
 Meistera yunannensis (S.Q.Tong) Skornick. & M.F.Newman

References

External links
 

Alpinioideae
Zingiberales genera